Hai'an railway station is a railway station in Hai'an, Nantong, Jiangsu, China.

History
Construction on the station began in 1998. It was sited at the intersection point between the Xinyi–Changxing railway and the Nanjing–Qidong railway. It opened in 2004. On 8 February 2015, a new station building was opened.

Station name
On 20 August 2018, the name of the station was changed from Hai'an County to Hai'an. This followed the former Hai'an railway station in Xuwen County, Guangdong Province changing its name to Hai'an South.

References 

Railway stations in Jiangsu
Railway stations in China opened in 2004